A multitude is a vague term for a large number of people, typically relating to an assembly.

Multitude or multitudes may also refer to:

Multitude: War and Democracy in the Age of Empire, a 2004 book by Antonio Negri and Michael Hardt
Multitude Media, a British public relations firm
Multitudes (journal), a French journal of philophy, politics, and art
Multitudes (album), a 2023 album by Feist
"Multitude", a song by Half Man Half Biscuit from the album Four Lads Who Shook the Wirral
Multitude (album), a 2022 album by Belgian musician, Stromae

See also
The Masses (disambiguation)